Rafael Cruz (born 1939) is a minister and the father of U.S. Senator Ted Cruz.

Rafael or Raphael Cruz may also refer to:

 Rafael Peñas Cruz (born 1964), Spanish novelist
 Rafael Santa Cruz (1960–2014), Peruvian musician
 Rafael Cruz (footballer) (born 1985), Brazilian footballer
 Raphael Cruz (1986–2018), American acrobat, clown and actor
 Ted Cruz (born 1970), full name Rafael Edward Cruz, U.S. senator
 Rafael Cruz (1910s pitcher), Puerto Rican baseball player
 Rafael Cruz (2000s pitcher), Dominican baseball player